Peucedanum cervaria is a herbaceous plant in the genus Peucedanum belonging to the carrot family Apiaceae.

Description
The stems are cylindrical, glabrous and erect. They are more or less branched and the leaves are slightly blue-green and two to three times pinnatifid. The large umbels have 9 to 30 rays bearing small white flowers. The flowering period extends from July through September in their native habitat.

This plant has its overwintering buds situated just below the soil surface (hemicryptophyte) and an almost leafless stalk growing directly from the ground (scapose). The fruits are oval, about 4 to 6 mm long and 3 to 4 mm wide, with narrow marginal ridges.

Distribution
This plant is a sub-Mediterranean species widespread in southern and central Europe, from Spain, Italy and the Balkan Peninsula up to central Russia.

Habitat

Gallery

References

External links
 Biolib
 Flora

cervaria